Basketball appeared '''at the 1904 Summer Olympics for the first time, as a demonstration sport. There were four different events that took place in Saint Louis, for basketball competition.

Amateur championships
Buffalo German YMCA def. Missouri AC, 97–8
Chicago Central YMCA def. Sawyer AB, 56–6
Buffalo German YMCA def. Turner Tigers, 77–6
Chicago Central YMCA def. Turner Tigers (Turner Tigers forfeited)
Buffalo German YMCA def. Xavier AA, 36–28
Buffalo German YMCA def. Chicago Central YMCA, 39–28
Chicago Central YMCA def. Missouri AC, 2–0 (Missouri AC failed to appear)

College basketball
Hiram College def. Wheaton College, 23–20
Wheaton College def. Latter-day Saints' University, 40–35
Hiram College def. Latter-day Saints' University, 25–18

 Hiram College, 2–0
 Wheaton College, 1–1
 Latter-day Saints' University, 0–2

 
1904
1904–05 in American basketball
basketball
Basketball competitions in the United States
Olympic demonstration sports
Basketball in St. Louis